Pristimantis ornatissimus is a species of frog in the family Strabomantidae.
It is endemic to Ecuador.
Its natural habitats are tropical moist lowland forests and moist montane forests, at altitudes of 400–1800 meters.
It is threatened by habitat loss.

References

ornatissimus
Amphibians of Ecuador
Endemic fauna of Ecuador
Amphibians described in 1911
Taxonomy articles created by Polbot